Hurst Creek is a tributary of the Colorado River in Central Texas. Hurst Creek flows north through Lakeway and empties into Lake Travis.

See also
 List of Texas rivers

References

Rivers of Texas
Rivers of Travis County, Texas
Texas Hill Country